Patrick James McCoy (born August 3, 1988) is an American former professional baseball pitcher. He played in Major League Baseball (MLB) for the Detroit Tigers.

Early life
McCoy attended Sahuaro High School in Tucson, Arizona, where he posted a 7–3 record, with a 2.71 ERA, striking out 89 in 62 innings in his junior year. During his senior year, he posted a 2–0 record, with a 0.64 ERA, striking out 24 in 11 innings.

McCoy was a member of team Arizona at the 2006 Junior Sunbelt, where they finished the tournament in 6th place, with a 5–5 record. McCoy was a member of team Arizona at the 2007 Senior Sunbelt, where they finished the tournament in 3rd place, with a 7–3 record.

Professional career

Washington Nationals
McCoy was drafted by the Washington Nationals in the 10th round of the 2007 Major League Baseball Draft. McCoy played in the Nationals minor league system until 2013. McCoy reached the Triple-A level for the first time in 2013, appearing in seven games for the Syracuse Chiefs. McCoy spent most of the year with Double-A Harrisburg where he posted a 2–1 record, with a 4.32 ERA, and striking out 36 in 41.2 innings. From the end of June 30 to July 19, he had a streak of seven-consecutive scoreless relief appearance for the Senators. During McCoy's seven years with the Nationals' organization he accumulated 16 wins, 311 strikeouts, and a 4.67 ERA in 224 games.

Detroit Tigers
McCoy signed a minor league contract with the Detroit Tigers in December 2013. On June 21, 2014, the Detroit Tigers purchased McCoy's contract from Triple-A Toledo. McCoy made his major league debut the next day in a game against the Cleveland Indians. Before being called up, McCoy posted a 3–0 record, with a 2.94 ERA and a .246 batting average against between Double-A Erie and Triple-A Toledo. The Tigers called up McCoy again on August 23, 2014 before a doubleheader with the Minnesota Twins.

Baltimore Orioles
On October 31, 2014, McCoy was claimed off waivers by the Baltimore Orioles. He was outrighted to AAA Norfolk Tides on December 8, 2014.

Toronto Blue Jays
McCoy signed a minor league contract with the Toronto Blue Jays on December 18, 2015, that included an invitation to spring training.

Colorado Rockies
On June 19, McCoy was traded to the Colorado Rockies and assigned to the Triple-A Albuquerque Isotopes.

Cleveland Indians
On February 17, 2017, McCoy signed a minor league deal with the Cleveland Indians. He was released on April 4, 2017.

Southern Maryland Blue Crabs
On May 12, 2017, McCoy signed with the Southern Maryland Blue Crabs of the Atlantic League of Professional Baseball. He was released on July 20, 2017.

Generales de Durango
On March 7, 2018, McCoy signed with the Generales de Durango of the Mexican League. He was released on May 4, 2018.

York Revolution
On May 18, 2018, McCoy signed with the York Revolution of the Atlantic League of Professional Baseball. He was released on July 13, 2018.

Sugar Land Skeeters
On July 16, 2018, McCoy signed with the Sugar Land Skeeters of the Atlantic League of Professional Baseball. McCoy announced his retirement on August 2, 2018.

References

External links

1988 births
Living people
American expatriate baseball players in Mexico
Baseball players from Tucson, Arizona
Bowie Baysox players
Buffalo Bisons (minor league) players
Detroit Tigers players
Erie SeaWolves players
Generales de Durango players
Gigantes del Cibao players
American expatriate baseball players in the Dominican Republic
Gulf Coast Nationals players
Hagerstown Suns players
Harrisburg Senators players
Indios de Mayagüez players
Leones de Ponce players
Major League Baseball pitchers
Mexican League baseball pitchers
Navegantes del Magallanes players
American expatriate baseball players in Venezuela
Norfolk Tides players
Potomac Nationals players
Sugar Land Skeeters players
Syracuse Chiefs players
Toledo Mud Hens players
Vermont Lake Monsters players
Venados de Mazatlán players
York Revolution players
Sahuaro High School alumni